Paloheimo is a Finnish surname. Notable people with the surname include:

Eero Paloheimo (born 1936), Finnish artist and politician
Hjalmar Gabriel Paloheimo (1864–1919), Finnish industrialist and founder of the H. G. Paloheimo Oy company
Laura Paloheimo (born 1971), Finnish author
Maila Paloheimo (1910–1989), Finnish teacher and author
Oiva Paloheimo (1910–1973), Finnish author and poet
Veli Paloheimo (born 1967), Finnish tennis player

Finnish-language surnames